Kerber is a German surname. Notable people with the surname include:

 Angelique Kerber (born 1988), German tennis player
 Jasmine Kerber (born 1996), American rhythmic gymnast
 Leonid Kerber, Soviet aerospace constructor
 Linda K. Kerber, American historian
 Randy Kerber (born 1958), American composer and musician
 Robert Kerber (1913–1991), American swimmer

See also
 Körber (surname)

German-language surnames